Andy M Wright (born 1962) is a London-based music producer, songwriter, and arranger who has worked with international artists such as Simply Red and Mick Hucknall, Simple Minds, Jeff Beck, Eurythmics, Dave Stewart, Toše Proeski, Atomic Kitten, Imelda May, and Andreas Vollenweider.

Since the mid 1980's, he has worked as a programmer, keyboard player, session musician, musical arranger, and notably, a producer on projects spanning multiple music genres.

Early career
Beginning in the mid-1980s, Wright played and performed in various bands and worked for a keyboard and equipment rental company in London, delivering and setting up instruments and studio gear for recording sessions. During this time he became proficient in the latest technologies then in use - and, already an accomplished keyboard player and musician, he was subsequently employed at Trident Studios, London, over several years. Whilst at Trident he played and programmed keyboards on sessions for many of the major acts of the time, and generally began to learn the art of recording and production.

The 1990s
During the 1990s, Wright set up his first recording studio in London's Primrose Hill. As a musician/producer/programmer, he worked on The KLF hit "America:What Time Is Love?" followed by a programming stint with Massive Attack on their album Protection. 1995 also saw the beginning of Wright's long working relationship with Simply Red on the album Life. his work helping to spawn a number one hit single "Fairground".

During this period, Wright also collaborated on pop records for Shakespear's Sister, Imogen Heap, Sinead O'Connor and Alisha's Attic. He also has a co-production credit with Tom Jones on the album The Lead and How To Swing It with Alan Moulder and U2 producer Flood.

In 1999, Wright was involved in the production of the Eurythmics album Peace which included the hit singles "I Saved the World Today", "17 Again" and the title track "Peace".

2000s to present
In 2000, Wright began working with noted guitarist Jeff Beck. The resulting album, You Had It Coming, produced the Grammy award-winning track "Dirty Mind" in the best rock instrumental performance category. Concurrently, Wright also produced the single "Reach" for S Club 7 as well as "Bring It All Back".

In 2001, Wright's production of Atomic Kitten's "Eternal Flame" reached number 1 in the UK charts. Wright followed this with production of Gianna Nannini's album Aria in 2002.

In 2003, Wright and Jeff Beck worked together again on the eponymously titled album Jeff. This produced the Grammy winning track, "Plan B", also in the best rock instrumental performance category. Wright's productions in 2003 also included "Sunrise", the first single to be released from the album Home by Simply Red, as well as working on "A Thousand Beautiful Things" for Annie Lennox, plus the song "Caruso" for the Italian tenor Luciano Pavarotti on the album "Ti Adoro".

2004 / 2005 involved extensive work for Simply Red including co-production of the album Simplified.

In 2006, Wright began his collaboration with Macedonian artist Toše Proeski on songs for the album The Hardest Thing. Following Proeski's death in October 2007, The Hardest Thing was released posthumously in January 2009, going on to notable success throughout the Balkan region. He also worked with Soho Dolls, the Icelandic group, Nylon, and further projects for Simply Red.

In 2007, he contributed to Stay, for Simply Red.

In 2008, Wright worked on production of Mick Hucknall's first solo album post-Simply Red: Tribute to Bobby.

Highlights from recent projects
The following are some of the notable projects that Wright has either produced or co-produced in the years since 2009.

Musical credits
An extensive list of Wright's work is catalogued on AllMusic.

References

1962 births
English record producers
English songwriters
Simply Red members
People from Arnold, Nottinghamshire
Living people
Missing middle or first names
Date of birth missing (living people)